Saqqaabad (also Romanized as Saqqāābād and Saqāābād; also known as Saghgha Abad) is a village in Dehqanan Rural District, in the Central District of Kharameh County, Fars Province, Iran. At the 2006 census, its population was 283, in 69 families.

References 

Populated places in Kharameh County